Roma Thapa (born 17 August 1997) is a Nepalese cricketer who plays for the Nepal women's national cricket team.

International career 
She made her Twenty20 International debut against China women's in the Thailand Women's T20 Smash. She also represented Nepal in the 2019 ICC Women's Qualifier Asia in Bangkok, Thailand. This tournament was the part of Asia region qualifier for the 2019 ICC Women's World Twenty20 Qualifier as well as the 2020 Women's Cricket World Cup Qualifier tournaments, with the top team progressing to both of them.

References

External links 
 

1997 births
Living people
Nepalese women cricketers
Nepal women Twenty20 International cricketers
South Asian Games bronze medalists for Nepal
South Asian Games medalists in cricket